Gaffes et gadgets, written and drawn by Franquin, is an album in the original Gaston Lagaffe series, numbered 0. It is made up of strips and illustrations originally published in Spirou, and was published by Dupuis in 1985. It consists of 48 pages.

Story
Fantasio finds it difficult to put up with Gaston's devices and inventions.

Inventions
paperclip: the biggest paperclip ever invented
Gastomobile: small vehicle which allows Gaston to get rapidly around Spirou offices.
a rocket: it intriguished many foreign secret services
anti-black ice chair: chair on casters to prevent Gaston from sliding on patches of black ice
automatic filing chest: a small button open directly the filing chest, no need to open drawers
artificial satellite : consists in making a ball turning around one's head

Background
This album consists of illustrations published in Spirou around 1957, at a time when Gaston Lagaffe was a character who served to fill the blanks in the magazine. It also collects some strips which never before had been published in album, plus some who were previously published in the small-sized album entitled Gaston, published in 1960.

References

 Gaston Lagaffe classic series on the official website
 Publication in Spirou  on bdoubliées.com.

External links
Official website 

1985 graphic novels
Comics by André Franquin